The eighth season of the police procedural drama NCIS premiered on September 21, 2010 in the same time slot as the previous season.

The season story arc involves Ziva's largely-unseen boyfriend, Ray, and the CIA continuing to meddle in NCIS's day-to-day workings. Notable events include the terrorism and internal affairs threat during the "Enemies" two-parter, and the arrival of another Major Case Response Team from Rota, Spain, the team that Tony was offered to be lead of in the beginning of season four. The season ends on a five-part story arc involving the Port-to-Port killer that menaced both teams. The finale aired on May 17, 2011.

Cast

Main 
 Mark Harmon as Leroy Jethro Gibbs, NCIS Supervisory Special Agent (SSA) of the Major Case Response Team (MCRT) assigned to Washington's Navy Yard
 Michael Weatherly as Anthony DiNozzo, NCIS Senior Special Agent, second in command of MCRT
 Cote de Pablo as Ziva David, NCIS Probationary Special Agent
 Pauley Perrette as Abby Sciuto, Forensic Specialist for NCIS
 Sean Murray as Timothy McGee, NCIS Special Agent
 Rocky Carroll as Leon Vance, NCIS Director
 David McCallum as Dr. Donald "Ducky" Mallard, Chief Medical Examiner for NCIS

Also starring 
 Brian Dietzen as Jimmy Palmer, Assistant Medical Examiner for NCIS

Recurring 
 Joe Spano as Tobias Fornell, FBI Senior Special Agent
 Muse Watson as Mike Franks, retired Senior Special Agent for NCIS and Gibbs' former boss
 David Dayan Fisher as Trent Kort, CIA Agent
 Michael Nouri as Eli David, Mossad Director and Ziva's father
 Ralph Waite as Jackson Gibbs, Gibbs' father
 Jude Ciccolella as Phillip Davenport, departing Secretary of the Navy
 Arnold Vosloo as Amit Hadar, Mossad Agent
 Bruce Boxleitner as Vice Admiral C. Clifford Chase
 Robert Wagner as Anthony DiNozzo, Sr., Tony's father
 Diane Neal as Abigail Borin, CGIS Special Agent in Charge
 TJ Ramini as Malachi Ben-Gidon, Mossad Agent
 Marco Sanchez as Alejandro Rivera, official of the Mexican Justice Department
 Jacqueline Obradors as Paloma Reynosa, leader of a Mexican drug cartel
 Wendy Makkena as Dr. Rachel Cranston, a psychiatrist and Caitlin Todd's sister
 Michael O'Neill as Riley McCallister, retired Senior Special Agent for NCIS
 Sarah Jane Morris as E.J. Barrett, NCIS Senior Special Agent
 Matt Willig as Simon Cade, NCIS Special Agent
 Alimi Ballard as Gayne Levin, NCIS Special Agent
 Matt Craven as Clayton Jarvis, new Secretary of the Navy
 Enrique Murciano as Ray Cruz, CIA Agent
 Tamer Hassan as Agah Bayar, NCIS target
 Kerr Smith as Jonas Cobb, NCIS target and killer of Mike Franks

Guest appearances 
 Sasha Alexander as Caitlin Todd, deceased NCIS Special Agent who was killed by Ari Haswari
 Jason Beghe as Blake Martin
 Tim Kelleher as Chris Pacci, deceased NCIS Special Agent
 Meredith Monroe as April Ferris

Episodes

Ratings

References

General references

External links

 

2010 American television seasons
2011 American television seasons
NCIS 08